Metopacanthus is an extinct genus of cartilaginous fish from the Early Jurassic epoch in Europe. It is known from the Toarcian of the Posidonia Shale of Germany. It is unusual due to being an extrange aberrant Chimaera, with a jaw-like structure over the skull.

References 

Prehistoric cartilaginous fish genera
Jurassic cartilaginous fish
Early Jurassic fish
Toarcian life
Jurassic fish of Europe
Jurassic Germany
Fossils of Germany
Posidonia Shale